Coffee Creek may refer to:

Canada
Coffee Creek (Kootenay River), British Columbia
Coffee Creek (Yukon River), Yukon
Coffee Creek, Yukon, an unincorporated place

United States
Coffee Creek (Dishna River), Alaska
Coffee Creek, California, a census-designated place
Coffee Creek (Trinity River), California
Coffee Creek (East Arm Little Calumet River), a stream in Indiana
Coffee Creek, Kentucky, an unincorporated community
Coffee Creek (Saint Louis River), Minnesota
Coffee Creek (Missouri), a stream in Missouri
Coffee Creek (Montana), a stream in Montana
Coffee Creek, Montana, an unincorporated community
Coffee Creek Correctional Facility, Oregon
Coffee Creek (Brokenstraw Creek), Pennsylvania